The following people were born or based their life in Tamil Nadu, formerly known as Madras State:

Arts and language 
R.K. Narayan (1906–2001), writer

Business 
Anil Kumar (born 1958), management consultant who pled guilty to insider trading
Sundar Pichai, CEO of Google
Indra Nooyi, Chairperson & CEO of PepsiCo
Shiv Nadar, founder and chairman of HCL Technologies
Venu Srinivasan, chairman and managing director, TVS Motors.
C Vijayakumar, CEO of HCL Technologies
Mallika Srinivasan, chairman and managing director, Tractors and Farm Equipment Limited 
N. Srinivasan, chairman and managing director, India Cements Ltd.
A. Vellayan, chairman, Murugappa Group of Companies
M. A. M. Ramaswamy, Chettinad Cements Group of Companies and ex-Pro Chancellor, Annamalai University, Chidambaram.
A. C. Muthiah, former chairman, Southern Petrochemicals of India Corporation (SPIC) group of companies
Prathap C. Reddy, chairman, Apollo Hospitals
Naveen Selvadurai, co-founder of Foursquare
Natarajan Chandrasekaran, chairperson and current chairman of TATA Group
Keshav R Murugesh, chief executive officer and director of WNS Global Services
Rahul Mammen Mappillai, managing director of MRF Limited
Kalanithi Maran, chairman and managing director, Sun Group
R. G. Chandramogan, chairman of Hatsun Agro Product
Dora Metcalf, entrepreneur, mathematician and engineer

Education 
V. L. Ethiraj, founder, Ethiraj College for Women
Rajalakshmi Parthasarathy, founder, Padma Seshadri Bala Bhavan
Munirathna Anandakrishnan, former chairman, Indian Institute of Technology Kanpur & Former vice-chancellor, Anna University
Bala V. Balachandran, founder, dean and chairman, Great Lakes Institute of Management
V. M. Muralidharan, chairman, Ethiraj College for Women
Jeppiaar, founder, Jeppiaar Educational Trust and founder chancellor, Sathyabama University
Subra Suresh, president of Carnegie Mellon University, former dean of the School of Engineering at the Massachusetts Institute of Technology, former director of the National Science Foundation
Ramayya Krishnan, dean of Heinz College and H. John Heinz III, W. W. Cooper and Ruth F. Cooper Professor of Management science and Information systems at Carnegie Mellon University
Madhu Bhaskaran, engineer and professor at RMIT University

Environment
Arun Krishnamurthy, founder, Environmentalist Foundation of India

Films and entertainment 
Shivaji Ganesan, actor and the first International Award winner of India
Rajini Kanth, actor, producer, Screenwriter
Kamal Haasan, thespian, director, producer, Screenwriter
Vijay, thespian, actor, playbacksinger, IARA (International achievement recognition award winner)
Ajith Kumar, thespian and racer
Vikram, thespian
Suriya, thespian
Dhanush, thespian and playback singer and producer
A. R. Rahman (born 1966), music composer, winner of multiple awards including two Academy Awards, two Grammys and a Golden Globe
Anirudh Ravichander, music composer
Ilaiyaraja, Indian music composer and Symphonic Maestro
Yuvan Shankar Raja, First Cypress-International-Award Winning Creative music Composer
Santhanam, actor
Vijay Yesudas (born 1979), playback singer
Pete Best (born 1941), early Beatles drummer
Mary Hignett (born 1916), actress
Engelbert Humperdinck (born 1936), pop singer
Ashok Amritraj, Hollywood producer
Padma Lakshmi, cookbook author, actress, model and television host
Vyjayanthimala, actress
Hema Malini, actress
Rekha, actress
Sridevi, actress
Sripriya, actress
Srividya, actress
Jayasudha, actress
Jayabharathi, actress
Lisa Haydon, actress
S. Janaki, playback singer
M. S. Viswanathan, music composer
K. V. Mahadevan, music composer
S.P. Balasubrahmanyam, music composer, playback singer
Sumalatha, actress
Lakshmi Narayan, actress
Mahesh Babu, actor
Allu Arjun, actor
Ram Charan Teja, actor
Lakshmi Manchu, actress
Sundeep Kishan, actor
Priya Anand, actress
Shruthi Hassan, actress
Samantha Ruth Prabhu, actress
Olive Rae, soprano and actress
Siddharth Narayan, actor
Trisha, actress
Arvind Swamy, actor and businessman
Vijay Sethupathi, thespian
Sivakarthikeyan, thespian
Shiva Rajkumar, Kannada actor
Puneeth Rajkumar, Kannada actor
Vidya Vox, Indian YouTuber and musician
Rochelle Rao, Indian actress and Miss India international 2012

Directors
K.Balachander, Tamil film director
Mani Ratnam, Tamil film director
S. Shankar, Tamil film director
A. R. Murugadoss, Tamil film director
Selvaraghavan, Tamil film director
Nalan Kumarasamy, Tamil film director
Karthik Subburaj, Tamil film director
Vetrimaran, Tamil film director
Lokesh Kanagaraj, Tamil film director

Religion 
 Jesu Pudumai Doss (b. 1967), Catholic priest, Professor and Dean, Faculty of Canon Law, Salesian Pontifical University, Rome
 Sri Sabhapati Swami (b. 1840), 19th-century yogi and author
 Paruthiyur K. Santhanaraman, author of numerous books on religious topics

Scientists 
Shyamala Gopalan, breast cancer researcher and mother of Vice President of the United States Kamala Harris
A. P. J. Abdul Kalam, physics, president of India
C.V. Raman, Nobel Prize, physics
Kariamanickam Srinivasa Krishnan, physics (co-discoverer of Raman scattering)
Subra Suresh (see above)
Kannan Soundararajan, mathematician
John Henry Constantine Whitehead (1904–1960), British mathematician
Alan Garnett Davenport, engineer
Srinivasa Ramanujan, mathematician, Fellow of the Royal Society
Subrahmanyan Chandrasekhar, Nobel Prize, physics
M. S. Swaminathan, Agriculture Scientist of India

Social entrepreneurs 
 Kirthi Jayakumar

Sports 

Buchi Babu Naidu- Father of South Indian Cricket.
Cotah Ramaswami- Represented India in both International Cricket & Tennis.
M.Baliah Naidu- Cricketer
Aditya Patel (born 1988), Indian professional racing driver 
Viswanathan Anand (born 1969), chess grandmaster and the undisputed world chess champion from 2007 until 2013
Nasser Hussain (born 1968), former English cricketer
Dinesh Karthik (born 1985), Indian cricketer
Sharath Kamal (born 1982), India table tennis player
Hemang Badani, former Indian cricketer
Subramaniam Badrinath, former Indian cricketer
Krishnamachari Srikkanth (born 1959), former Indian cricketer
Lakshmipathy Balaji, Indian cricketer
Murali Vijay (born 1984), current Indian cricketer
Sadagoppan Ramesh, former Indian cricketer
Srinivasaraghavan Venkataraghavan, former Indian cricketer 
Thirush Kamini, Indian woman cricketer
W. V. Raman, former Indian cricketer
Washington Sundar, Indian cricketer
Vijay Amritraj (born 1953), tennis player, Sports Commentator and actor
Anand Amritraj (born 1952), tennis player, businessman
Ramanathan Krishnan, tennis player
Ramesh Krishnan, tennis player and coach
Dipika Pallikal (born 1991), squash player, WISPA titles and first Indian woman to break into the top 10 in the WSA rankings
Joshna Chinappa (born 1986), squash player, British Squash Championship
Karun Chandhok (born 1984), racing driver, Formula One and sports commentator
Rajini Krishnan, Indian Motorcycle racer
Mahaveer Raghunathan (born 1998), racing driver
Edward Foord (1825–1899), cricketer
George Gowan (1818–1890), cricketer
Ravichandran Ashwin , cricketer
Jack Pritchard (1895–1936), cricketer
Roopa Unnikrishnan, former Indian sports-rifle shooter; Commonwealth Games gold medalist
Dommaraju Gukesh (born 2006), chess grandmaster
Rameshbabu Praggnanandhaa (born 2005), chess grandmaster

Miscellaneous
Maulvi Ahmadullah Shah Faizabadi Madrasi or Ahmadullah Shah (1787–1858), Indian freedom fighter
General Paramasiva Prabhakar Kumaramangalam, DSO, MBE 6th chief of Indian army (1913–2000)
 Pramila Jayapal, U.S. Representative
 Ravivarman Sharmila, carrom champion 
 Nugent Grant, lawyer 
 Praveena Solomon, crematorium manager
 V. D. Trivadi, humorist
 Abhinandan Varthaman, wing commander in the Indian Air Force

References

 
Chennai
People
Chennai